The Storming of Bolton, sometimes referred to as the "Bolton massacre", was an event in the First English Civil War which happened on 28 May 1644. The strongly Parliamentarian town was stormed and captured by Royalist forces under Prince Rupert. It was alleged that up to 1,600 of Bolton's defenders and inhabitants were slaughtered during and after the fighting. The "massacre at Bolton" became a staple of Parliamentarian propaganda.

Background
In Lancashire, before the start of the civil war, there was social and economic tension between towns which generally supported Parliament, and the landowning gentry and aristocracy who controlled the rural areas and mostly supported the king as Royalists. There was a religious divide with some towns supporting dissenting nonconformist movements. Bolton was known as the "Geneva of the north", a reference to the city in Switzerland which was a centre of Calvinism.

The major Royalist figure in Lancashire was James Stanley, 7th Earl of Derby. He was slow to take measures to secure the county at the start of the civil war in 1642, and after setbacks the following year, including two failed attempts to capture Bolton, he temporarily abandoned the contest in Lancashire to secure the other area in which he held major interests, the Isle of Man. The only threat to Parliamentarian control of Lancashire came from Cheshire, where a Royalist army under John Byron, 1st Baron Byron was formed in late 1643. On 26 January 1644, Byron was defeated at the Battle of Nantwich by Parliamentarians under Sir William Brereton and Sir Thomas Fairfax, leaving Parliamentarians in control of the area.

Fairfax's army and some Lancashire Parliamentarians under Colonel Alexander Rigby began the Siege of Lathom House, seat of the Earl of Derby, which was defended by his wife, the Countess of Derby. However, Fairfax crossed the Pennines in late March to rejoin his father, Lord Fairfax, in Yorkshire.

Campaign
The Royalists had intended to send the king's nephew and foremost field commander, Prince Rupert, to the northwest to retrieve the situation early in 1644. Rupert set up headquarters in Shrewsbury, from where he led a force to the Relief of Newark. It became even more important to regain the northwest when the Fairfaxes and a Scottish Covenanter army began the Siege of York on 22 April. As Rupert lacked the strength to proceed immediately to relieve York, it was agreed at a council of war in Oxford, the King's wartime capital, that he would first move into Lancashire to restore Royalist fortunes, use the Earl of Derby's influence to gather fresh recruits, and secure the port of Liverpool to allow communications with Royalist forces in Ireland.

Rupert, accompanied by the Earl of Derby, marched north from Shrewsbury on 16 May. He added Byron's army from Cheshire and North Wales to his own small force, giving him a total of 2,000 cavalry and 6,000 infantry. To cross the Mersey he had to secure a crossing at either Warrington or Stockport. He chose the latter, and stormed it on 25 May. The town was not fortified, and after a brief contest outside the town in the late evening the defenders fled to Manchester.

On hearing of the loss of Stockport, Colonel Rigby's forces abandoned the Siege of Lathom House and retired to Bolton, where the garrison was commanded by Colonel Shuttleworth.

Storming
Late on 28 May, as Prince Rupert approached Bolton, he sent Colonel Henry Tillier, his quartermaster-general, with a regiment of cavalry and another of infantry to secure the town. They found the Parliamentarians retiring from Lathom House arriving in confusion. On hearing this, Prince Rupert hastened his march and attacked immediately, in pouring rain. Nevertheless, the Parliamentarians manned a defensive line around the town with 4,000 men. Rupert's first assault, by the Regiments of Foot commanded by Colonels Ellice, Tyldesley, Warren and Tillier, and his own Regiment of Foot commanded by Lieutenant Colonel John Russell, was repulsed with 300 casualties. Russell was wounded and his Major was taken prisoner.

Prince Rupert then ordered the regiment of Colonel Broughton to renew the attack. Led by the Earl of Derby, they were successful, and fighting continued in the streets until the Parliamentarian forces were overcome or had fled. The Royalists claimed that there were 1,000 Parliamentarian casualties and that in addition to 50 officers and 600 other prisoners, the Royalists captured 20 standards, 20 barrels of powder and many weapons.

The Parliamentarian commander, Colonel Alexander Rigby, escaped in the confusion, having learned the Royalist password. He made his way to the Parliamentarian and Covenanter "Army of Both Kingdoms" besieging York, where he claimed that 1,500 of his total force had been poorly armed clubmen. He also claimed that he lost only 200 men, the rest of his forces having fled, but the commanders of the armies around York noted that "vulgar reports" were that they had been slaughtered.

Causes
The storming was a particularly brutal episode in the Civil War and several factors may have contributed to the nature of the action. Unlike a formal siege, usually preceded by parleys and often ended at some point by a negotiated surrender, Rupert attacked suddenly to catch the Parliamentarians in temporary disarray. Without any possibility of negotiation, there was little protection from the "laws" or contemporary conventions of warfare for any of the garrison who did not surrender or flee immediately. As fighting took place in the streets of the town, the citizens would have been caught up in the fighting and because the battle took place at night and in heavy rain, it would have been difficult to distinguish between citizens and armed combatants. The Royalist soldiers were allowed to plunder the town after the fighting as a reward, and citizens may have died during the ensuing rapine.

At least two of the attacking Royalist regiments (Warren's and Broughton's) had been raised in England in 1640 to serve in the Bishops' Wars but were sent to Ireland after the Irish Rebellion of 1641. They returned to serve in the Royalist armies in England in 1644 after King Charles negotiated a ceasefire with Confederate Ireland. The Parliamentarians nevertheless believed that they consisted of Irish Catholics. The Royalists claimed that at some point during the fighting, the Parliamentarians hanged a captured Irishman as a "Papist", enraging the attackers. Tyldesley's regiment had been raised in Lancashire and included many Roman Catholics.

Effects and subsequent events
After storming Bolton, Rupert's army rested at Bury, where it was reinforced. He then advanced on Liverpool and opened a siege and bombardment on 6 June. At midday on 10 June, having made breaches in the earth walls with cannon fire, the Royalists launched an assault which was beaten back. During the following night, the Parliamentarians abandoned the town and left aboard ships in the harbour, leaving their colours on the remains of the walls as a ruse. When Colonel Henry Tillier's regiment (another unit recently returned from Ireland) advanced into the town the next morning, they found 400 remaining defenders "of the meaner sorte", many of whom were killed, only some being given quarter.

The only remaining major Parliamentarian foothold in Lancashire was Manchester, which was heavily defended and could not have been captured without a prolonged siege. Rupert was instructed by King Charles to hasten to the relief of York which he relieved on 1 July. The next day, he offered battle to the besieging armies and was decisively defeated at the Battle of Marston Moor. He withdrew to Lancashire, and subsequently went south to rejoin the king.

Lord Byron was left to hold the north-west. On 19 August, his cavalry was defeated at the Battle of Ormskirk, and the Royalists abandoned Lancashire. Bolton was recaptured, without any noteworthy fighting, in September. On 18 September, Byron's army was destroyed while attempting to prevent a Relief of Montgomery Castle. Parliamentarians commanded by Sir John Meldrum recaptured Liverpool on 1 November. Meldrum spared the garrison, including soldiers returned from or recruited in Ireland, despite a Parliamentarian Ordinance of no quarter to the Irish. Lathom House was besieged again from July 1644, but held out until 2 December 1645.

Death of the Earl of Derby

At the end of the Third English Civil War the Earl of Derby travelled north and was captured near Nantwich and given quarter. However, he was tried by court-martial at Chester on 29 September 1651. His quarter was disallowed and he was condemned to death for treason (i.e. for communicating with King Charles II). His appeal for pardon was rejected and he escaped, but was recaptured by Captain Hector Schofield and on 15 October 1651, taken to Bolton where he reputedly spent his last hours at Ye Olde Man & Scythe public house, but more likely in a house on Churchgate  before being beheaded near the Market Cross on Churchgate.

See also
List of massacres in the United Kingdom

Notes

References

Sources

Further reading
  – A fictional story written about the events of the Bolton massacre
 
 

Bolton
Massacres in England
History of Bolton
1644 in England
Bolton
English Civil War
17th century in Lancashire
Massacres during the Wars of the Three Kingdoms
Bolton
Massacres committed by England